Yves Parlier (born 14 November 1960) is a French sailor.  He is very well known in the offshore sailing world and generally in France, where he was elected France's top sports personality in 2002.

Nicknamed "The extra-terrestrial" for his amazing exploits and capabilities, Parlier currently holds two offshore 24-hour distance sailing records, set in April and May 2006.

Career
Yves Parlier won (or participate in) the following events:
 1985: Mini Transat 6.50
 1991: Solitaire du Figaro
 1992: Single-Handed Trans-Atlantic Race
 1993 / 94: Vendée Globe participation
 1993: Route du Café
 1994: Route du Rhum
 1996 / 97: Vendée Globe participation
 1997: Transat Jacques Vabre (with Eric Tabarly)
 1998: Route de l'Or
 1999: Course de l'Europe
 2000 / 01: Vendée Globe participation
 2001:  Sailings on the multihull Banque Populaire with Lalou Roucayrol
Winners of the Grand Prix of Zeebruge

External links
 Skipper Bio
 Yves Parlier New Weapon in SailHead
 

1960 births
Living people
French male sailors (sport)
1989 Vendee Globe sailors
1992 Vendee Globe sailors
1996 Vendee Globe sailors
2000 Vendee Globe sailors
French Vendee Globe sailors
Vendée Globe finishers
Single-handed circumnavigating sailors